Kafki (also Romanized as Kafkī and Kafgi; also known as Kafgīr) is a village in Baqeran Rural District, in the Central District of Birjand County, South Khorasan Province, Iran. At the 2006 census, its population was 43, in 17 families.

References 

Populated places in Birjand County